Lodderena ornata is a species of minute sea snail, a marine gastropod mollusk in the family Skeneidae.

Description
The size of the shell is 0.8 mm.

Distribution
This marine species occurs in the Atlantic Ocean off the Cape Verde Islands, the Gulf of Guinea, off Brazil; in the Gulf of Mexico and the Caribbean Sea. It has also been reported in the Indian Ocean.

References

 Olsson, A. A. and T. L. McGinty. 1958. Recent marine mollusks from the Caribbean coast of Panama with the description of some new genera and species. Bulletins of American Paleontology 39: 1–58, pls. 1–5.
 Rolán E., 2005. Malacological Fauna From The Cape Verde Archipelago. Part 1, Polyplacophora and Gastropoda

External links
 

ornata
Molluscs of the Atlantic Ocean
Molluscs of Brazil
Gastropods of Cape Verde
Molluscs of Mexico
Gastropods described in 1958